Jan Ivan Iriarte (born 4 October 1962) is a Guamanian windsurfer. He competed in the 1988 Summer Olympics, the 1992 Summer Olympics, and the 1996 Summer Olympics.

References

External links
 

1962 births
Living people
Guamanian windsurfers
Guamanian male sailors (sport)
Olympic sailors of Guam
Sailors at the 1988 Summer Olympics – Division II
Sailors at the 1992 Summer Olympics – Lechner A-390
Sailors at the 1996 Summer Olympics – Mistral One Design